The Amazing Live Sea Monkeys is a live action television series that aired for eleven episodes from September 19 to November 28, 1992. It focuses on three microscopic Sea-Monkeys — Dave (Rob LaBelle), Bill (Peter Pitofsky) and Aquarius (Sean Whalen) — who have been enlarged to human size by their benefactor, the Professor (Howie Mandel). Special guests include Stephen Furst, Gilbert Gottfried, Larry Melman, and Vernon Wells.

Creation
The concept of the show derived from the Sea Monkeys product, created in 1957 by Harold von Braunhut and marketed in the 1970s with a series of comic book ads designed and illustrated by Joe Orlando, later Vice President of DC Comics and Associate Publisher of Mad. Howie Mandel got the idea for the show after his daughter wanted to get some brine shrimp pets known as Sea Monkeys, which he also had as a child.

Mandel then decided that "This could be bigger than the Ninja Turtles." He then contacted The Chiodo Brothers; the show was then picked up, and produced as a series by CBS. The series aired in the United States and Australia. The character designs derive from the fantasy characters in the ads that Orlando drew for Harold von Braunhut, creator of the product.

Plot
The plot revolved around the notion that the Professor had accidentally enlarged three sea monkeys to human size, and plotlines followed their ensuing comical ineptness in the world. Each Sea Monkey displayed a certain odd character trait: Aquarius could not keep a secret, Bill was afraid of Imperial style beards, and Dave would grow excited at the sound of polka music.

They occasionally come into contact with their next door neighbours, the Brentwoods, whose daughter Sheila (Eliza Schneider) becomes the Sea-Monkeys' best friend. After the show's cancellation, it was replaced by Beakman's World, with Schneider playing the lead female role in that series as well.

Episode list

Broadcasts
  United States
 CBS (1992–1993)
  Canada
 YTV (1992–1996)

References

External links

1990s American children's comedy television series
1992 American television series debuts
1992 American television series endings
American children's fantasy television series
American television shows featuring puppetry
CBS original programming
YTV (Canadian TV channel) original programming